Beyond Elysian Fields is the sixth studio album by Hugh Cornwell, released by Invisible Hands Music on 4 October 2004 in the UK, with a worldwide release in 2005. It was produced by Tony Visconti and Danny Kadar.

The album title refers to Elysian Fields Avenue in New Orleans.

Critical reception

Adam Morton of The Age complimented Cornwell's "clipped, dry delivery" on the songs "Under Her Spell" and "Beauty on the Beach", but added that "melodies wane and lyrics become laboured on later tracks" such as "24/7". 
Helen Wright of musicOMH described the album as "something like a cross between [Bob] Dylan and Dire Straits at their best ... with a dash of the Traveling Wilburys for good measure." Wright also cautioned, "If you preferred the early Stranglers you'll probably hate this album." 
Graham Rockingham The Hamilton Spectator wrote, "Beyond Elysian Fields doesn't contain the in-your-face attitude of Stranglers' songs like "Peaches", "Grip" or "Hangin' Around" ... but it does contain that sardonic sense of humor and unmistakable voice. Cornwell's songwriting ventures into all sorts of unexpected territory."

Track listing

Personnel
Credits adapted from the album liner notes.

Hugh Cornwell - vocals, electric and acoustic guitar, keyboards (1, 9), toy piano (11), handclaps (5)
Steve Lawrence - bass, organ (3, 7), piano (10)
Windsor McGilvray - drums, percussion
Tony Visconti - recorder (2, 11), castanets (2), handclaps (5)
Scott Bourgeois - flute (5, 6)

Technical
Tony Visconti - producer, mixing (Looking Glass, New York)
Danny Kadar - producer, engineer (Truck Farm, New Orleans), cover photography
Mario J. McNulty - engineer (Looking Glass, New York)
Chris Goulstone - mastering
Ra - design, artwork 
Steve Double - cover photography  
Hugh Cornwell - sleeve concept

Beyond Acoustic Fields
Beyond Acoustic Fields (2007), is a limited edition CD, only available on tour, performed by Cornwell with acoustic guitar and vocal only and was recorded by Tony Visconti at his New York studio Looking Glass in 2003, to give Visconti an idea of the songs before producing the full album with the band.

Track listing: 
"Cadiz"
"Beauty on the Beach"
"The Land of a Thousand Kisses"
"24/7"
"Henry Moore"
"The Story of Harry Power"
"Picked Up by the Wind"
"Do Right Bayou"
"Under Her Spell"

References

2004 albums
Hugh Cornwell albums
Albums produced by Tony Visconti